The Cambodian national cricket team represents the country of Cambodia in international cricket competitions. The Cricket Association of Cambodia was established in 2021 as the legal governing body of the sport in the country. Most of the association's board members are local Cambodians.
First International Tennis Cricket Series 2022 was held on 20–21 August 2022 at Takhmou Stadium, Kandal Province organized by Cricket Federation Cambodia Association played between National Tennis Cricket Team of India administrated by Tennis Cricket Association of India and National Tennis Cricket Team of Cambodia administrated by Cricket Federation Cambodia Association. 

Cambodia applied for Asian Cricket Council membership, which was granted in 2012. The Association became a member of the National Olympic Committee of Cambodia in 2011 and were granted full membership of the Olympic Committee in 2021.

The team played his first international match on the Kinrara Oval ground in Malaysia against a Malaysian Development Squad in 2019.

Cricket in the former French colony of Cambodia is still a mainly expatriate game at senior level, although the sport is growing amongst younger Cambodians. A structured cricket league is being planned with the help of the Thailand Cricket League with both the National Stadium, Phnom Penh and the Army Stadium being available for matches. Cambodia will host the 2023 Southeast Asian Games, with cricket included as a sport. A cricket ground 10 km from Phnom Penh began construction in 2014. In March 2020, the Cambodia Cricket Association announced that a Cambodia Board XI team would tour Singapore in April 2020 to play three T20 matches, to prepare for Associate membership of the International Cricket Council. Due to COVID-19, the tour was postponed to May 2022.

Cambodia applied for ICC membership in 2021. In July 2022, Cambodia was awarded Associate membership status by ICC.

References

National cricket teams
Cricket
Cricket in Cambodia